Inape biremis is a species of moth of the family Tortricidae which is endemic to Colombia where it can be found on Nevado del Tolima.

References

Moths described in 1926
Endemic fauna of Colombia
biremis
Moths of South America